Madeira Airport, informally Funchal Airport, formerly Santa Catarina Airport and officially Cristiano Ronaldo International Airport, is an international airport in the civil parish of Santa Cruz in the Portuguese archipelago and autonomous region of Madeira. It mostly hosts flights to European metropolitan destinations due to Madeira's importance as a leisure destination, and is pivotal in the movement of cargo in and out of the archipelago of Madeira. It is the fourth-busiest airport in Portugal. The airport is named after Madeiran native Cristiano Ronaldo, who is widely considered to be one of the greatest footballers of all time. During its renaming ceremony in 2017, the airport drew media notoriety for an infamous bust of Ronaldo unveiled at the ceremony, now replaced.

The airport is considered one of the most peculiarly perilous airports in the world due to its location and its spectacular runway construction. It received the Outstanding Structure Award in 2004 by the International Association for Bridge and Structural Engineering. The History Channel programme Most Extreme Airports ranked it as the ninth most dangerous airport in the world and the third most dangerous in Europe. Pilots must undergo additional training to land at the airport.

Geography
Madeira Airport is a geographically unusual airport, as it is perched on a foreland jutting out to sea. At the end of runway 05, there lie hills and cliffs which make a direct ILS approach and landing unavailable. Instead aircraft have to do a visual approach which involves flying around the airport, then circling around in a ~180° turn before lining up on a very short final approach. The airport's runway - 05/23 - is a tabletop runway, which means there are steep dropoffs at either end of the runway - at the beginning of Runway 05, the runway drops off just before a motorway that snakes around the runway end, and at the beginning of Runway 23, which drops off a cliff. The runway is also unique in the fact that at the beginning of Runway 23, the runway is placed on a platform supported by pillars, similar to a beam bridge.

History

Madeira Airport was officially opened on 7 July 1964, with two  runways. The first flight to land there was a TAP Air Portugal Lockheed Constellation with 80 passengers on board.

In 1972, the popularity of visiting the island of Madeira increased, so the runway was extended to allow modern and larger aircraft to land. Considered the Kai Tak of Europe because of its singular approach to runway 05, the decision was made to extend the existing runway instead of building a new one. In the meantime, a new terminal was built at the airport in 1973, handling 500,000 passengers.

However, as demand for tourism continued to grow, the runway was extended further. Although this was a rare event, some TAP Air Portugal flights on the Lisbon-Caracas-Lisbon route used to have scheduled stops at Madeira with Airbus A330-200 widebody aircraft.

Name change
In 2016, it was announced that the airport would be renamed Madeira International Airport Cristiano Ronaldo (Aeroporto Internacional da Madeira Cristiano Ronaldo) in honour of Madeira native football player Cristiano Ronaldo. The rebranded terminal was unveiled on 29 March 2017, with a bust of Ronaldo also being presented.

Neither the bust nor the name change were unanimous, actually far from a consensus, as the former was ridiculed by Saturday Night Live'''s character Cecilia Giminez, portrayed by comedian and actress Kate McKinnon, with the latter being subject to much debate and controversy locally by politicians and citizens, who even started a petition against the move.

A year later, sports web site Bleacher Report commissioned sculptor Emanuel Santos to create another bust. However, this bust was never used; instead a new one was made by a Spanish sculptor, shown to the public on 15 June 2018.

Facilities

Runway
The airport was once infamous for its short runway of only , which, surrounded by high mountains and the ocean, made it a difficult and technically demanding landing for even the most experienced pilots. Because of the ~150° right-hand turn required, the airport has acquired the nickname of "Kai Tak Airport of Europe" - a reference to the former airport of Hong Kong that also needed a right-hand turn to line up for a landing very low and close to the runway.

The runway extension was conducted by the Brazilian construction company Andrade Gutierrez and is recognized worldwide as one of the most difficult to achieve due to the type of terrain and orography.

Its innovative solution allowed Funchal to receive the Outstanding Structure Award'' in 2004 by the International Association for Bridge and Structural Engineering, which aims at recognizing the most remarkable, innovative, creative, or otherwise stimulating structure completed within the last few years.

Terminal
The airport has a single terminal, which opened in 1973. The terminal has 40 check-in desks, 16 boarding gates, and 7 baggage belts. There are no air-bridges, so passengers either walk the short distance to the terminal or are taken by shuttle bus. The terminal itself is mostly underground.

Modernisation
In 2016, Madeira Airport was modernised and renovated by its operator, ANA Aeroportos de Portugal, as part of an €11 million investment. The renovated terminal area, which was opened in June 2016, by the President of the Autonomous Regional Government of Madeira, Miguel Albuquerque, improved the existing facility and facilitated the creation of a brand new shopping area, doubling the airport's overall capacity.

According to VINCI Airports, the airport will "have the capacity to deal with up to 1,400 passengers per hour", and the airport's overall new layout has been designed to enable to accommodation of new stores for national and international brands alike.

The passenger screening area, under the command of Serviço de Estrangeiros e Fronteiras, increased from 7,000 sq ft (650 m²) to 16,000 sq ft (1,500 m²), accommodating an increase in the number of security screening lines, while the passenger holding and verification area increased from 300 m² to 650 m². The new layout has simplified the passenger experience, creating defined areas for the Schengen Area (which the Autonomous Region of Madeira is part of) and non–Schengen Area passengers, and given the airport operator the ability to alternate these areas based on flight schedules. A new transfer hall and three new departure gates were also created as part of the project.

The renovation and investment project also accommodated the strengthening and re-profiling of the runway and taxiways, increasing the usable area by more than 16,000 sq ft (1,500 m2).

Airlines and destinations

Passenger
The following airlines operate regular scheduled passenger flights at Madeira Airport:

Cargo

Statistics

Accidents and incidents
 On 5 March 1973, an Aviaco Sud Caravelle 10R (registration EC-BID) crashed into the sea during the landing approach, resulting in the loss of the aircraft and three crew.
 On 19 November 1977, TAP Air Portugal Flight 425, a Boeing 727-200 (registration CS-TBR), was travelling from Brussels to Madeira via Lisbon. After a go-around, the aircraft attempted to land in poor weather conditions. It landed long on runway 24 (now runway 23) and plunged over a steep bank. It then struck a stone bridge, and the right wing was torn off, and then it crashed hard onto a beach. A fire broke out, setting the aircraft alight. Out of the 164 on board, 131 lost their lives.
 On 18 December 1977, SA de Transport Aérien Flight 730, a Sud Caravelle 10R (registration HB-ICK), was cleared for approach on runway 06 (now runway 05), but descended below , causing the aircraft to crash into the sea. 36 people died of the 57 on board.
On 11 September 2003 a Beechcraft aircraft carrying a UK pilot and nine Spanish passengers crashed into the sea shortly after taking off from the airport. All occupants died.

References

External links

 
 

1964 establishments in Portugal
Airports established in 1964
Airports in Portugal
Buildings and structures in Madeira
Cristiano Ronaldo
Transport in Madeira